Vikas Upadhyay (born 1975) is an Indian politician who is a Member of Legislative Assembly (MLA), Raipur West, Vidhan Sabha, Chhattisgarh state.

Early life 
He was born to a farmer's family in Raipur, Chhattisgarh, India. His family had no political background but he was attracted to politics from his student days and was known as a firebrand idealist with revolutionary fervor in student politics.

He joined the National Students Union of India (NSUI) during his early days of school in 1994. He became the President of NSUI Block, Raipur, was elected as the President of the College Unit and became the District President NSUI. He joined the National Committee as the Secretary, NSUI. He was given charge of the states of Rajasthan, Jammu & Kashmir and Himachal Pradesh. He was elected as the President of the NSUI for the state of Chhattisgarh.

Political career 
He was inducted into the Indian Youth Congress national committee as Secretary in 2009. During this time he travelled in the states of Punjab, Uttar Pradesh, Tripura and the union territory of Chandigarh.

After a year as the Secretary of All India Youth Congress, he was made General Secretary of the All India Youth Congress  in April 2010 when Rajiv Satav became the National President of Indian Youth Congress. He was given the charge of Delhi, Gujarat, and Daman Diu.

During his period in the Indian Youth Congress, he worked in the states of Madhya Pradesh, Delhi, Andhra Pradesh, Jharkhand, Himachal Pradesh, Jammu & Kashmir, Rajasthan, Punjab, Gujarat, Dadar & Nagar Haveli, Daman Diu, Orissa, Karnataka, Assam, Chandigarh, and Tripura.

He has launched an anti-drug program educating the people about the ill effects of drugs and helping families in the rehabilitation of the people affected.

References

Living people
People from Raipur, Chhattisgarh
Chhattisgarh politicians
Chhattisgarh MLAs 2018–2023
1977 births